Nge Mangsham Taktsab (? – 727) was a general of Tibetan Empire.

According to Tibetan Annals, Mangsham was appointed as the Lönchen in 725 after Shang Trisumje's death. He was ordered to convene a spring coalition in 726, and levied taxes on people who were directly subordinate to the emperor. He died in the next year and succeeded by another general, We Tadra Khonglo.

References
Old Tibetan Annals (version I), I.T.J. 0750
Old Tibetan Chronicle, P.T. 1287

8th-century Tibetan people
People of the Tibetan Empire
727 deaths
Date of birth unknown